The Bogotá grass mouse or Bogotá akodont, (Neomicroxus bogotensis) is a species of rodent in the family Cricetidae.
It is found in the Andes eastern and central Colombia and northwestern Venezuela.  Alavarado-Serrano and D'Elía (2013) have assigned the species to a new genus, Neomicroxus along with Neomicroxus latebricola.

References

Literature cited
Alavarado-Serrano, D. F. and G. D'Elía. 2013. A new genus for the Andean mice Akodon latebricola and A. bogotensis. (Rodentia: Sigmodontinae). Journal of Mammalogy, 94:995–1015.
Duff, A. and Lawson, A. 2004. Mammals of the World: A checklist. New Haven: A & C Black. 
Gómez-Laverde, M. and Rivas, B. 2008. . In IUCN. IUCN Red List of Threatened Species. Version 2009.2. <www.iucnredlist.org>. Downloaded on April 2, 2010.
Musser, G.G. and Carleton, M.D. 2005. Superfamily Muroidea. Pp. 894–1531 in Wilson, D.E. and Reeder, D.M. (eds.). Mammal Species of the World: a taxonomic and geographic reference. 3rd ed. Baltimore: The Johns Hopkins University Press, 2 vols., 2142 pp. 

Neomicroxus
Mammals of Colombia
Mammals of Venezuela
Mammals of the Andes
Altiplano Cundiboyacense
Mammals described in 1895
Taxa named by Oldfield Thomas
Taxonomy articles created by Polbot